Orquesta típica, or simply a típica, is a Latin American term for a band which plays popular music. The details vary from country to country. The term tends to be used for groups of medium size (about 8 to 12 musicians) in some well-defined instrumental set-up.

Argentina and Uruguay

In Argentina and Uruguay, the term orquesta típica is associated with tango music. The orquesta típica usually comprises a string section (three or four violins, and sometimes viola and cello), three or more bandoneons, and a rhythm section (piano and double bass). An orquesta típica is an expanded version of a sexteto típico, which includes 2 bandoneons, 2 violins, double bass and piano.

Cuba

In Cuba, a típica is an ensemble mainly composed of wind instruments, which was very popular in the mid-19th century. One of the earliest, Orquesta Flor de Cuba, had the following make-up: cornet, trombone, figle (ophicleide), two clarinets, two violins, double bass, kettle drum, and güiro. The ophicleide was a sort of bass bugle with keys, invented in 1817, now superseded by the tuba and/or baritone horn, the name surviving for a pipe organ stop; the trombone would be more typically a valved rather than a slide instrument.

In the early 20th century, there were still several popular orquestas típicas, such as those directed by Enrique Peña and Félix González. In 1915, charangas began to replace orquestas típica, a process which was largely complete by 1925. Charangas would become, along with son conjuntos and Cuban-style big bands, one of the main precursors of the salsa ensemble, which is characterized by the inclusion of multiple trombones. Salsa ensembles can also feature trumpets along with piano, double bass, güiro, conga and bongó. In the salsa context, the term típico usually refers to the sound of the conjuntos of the 1940s, such as Arsenio Rodríguez's, or to those of the original charangas danzoneras (charangas típicas), such as Arcaño y sus Maravillas, since orquestas típicas never reached the United States.

See also
Music of Latin America
Music of Argentina
Music of Cuba
Music of Uruguay

References

Types of musical groups
Cuban music
Cuban styles of music
Tango